Annette Huygens Tholen (born 1 January 1966 in Brisbane, Queensland), currently known as Annette Lynch, is an Australian beach volleyball player. She competed in the women's tournament in the 2000 Summer Olympics.

References

External links
 
 
 
 
 

1966 births
Living people
Australian women's beach volleyball players
Beach volleyball players at the 2000 Summer Olympics
Sportspeople from Brisbane
Olympic beach volleyball players of Australia